Dave Evans (born 1962) is a retired American television journalist. From 1999 to 2022, he worked as a reporter for WABC-TV in New York City, New York.

Early life and education

Evans earned a Bachelor of Arts degree in journalism from the Missouri School of Journalism at the University of Missouri in Columbia, Missouri.

Career
He was a reporter for KAKE-TV in Wichita, Kansas, for a few years.

More recently, Evans was a reporter for WFAA-TV in Dallas, Texas, where he was a senior political reporter for a decade. Evans covered several high-profile political stories and elections. He reported on Ross Perot's 1992 United States presidential campaign and his subsequent 1996 campaign, as well as the 1995 Oklahoma City bombing.

Evans has covered international affairs. He has reported on the Civil War that happened in Central America. He led coverage for the American intervention in Haiti.

He traveled to Iowa to cover the 2008 U.S. presidential election.

After serving as a political reporter for nearly 22 years for WABC-TV, Evans officially retired from reporting on January 7, 2022.

Accolades
Evans received the award for American Press Best Reporter in Texas.

See also

 List of American journalists
 List of people from Dallas
 List of people from New York City
 List of people from Wichita, Kansas
 List of television reporters
 List of University of Missouri alumni

References

External links
 

1962 births
Date of birth missing (living people)
Place of birth missing (living people)
American political journalists
Journalists from New York City
Journalists from Texas
Living people
New York (state) television reporters
People from Dallas
People from Wichita, Kansas
Missouri School of Journalism alumni
Journalists from Kansas
20th-century American journalists
American male journalists